

Events 
Mikołaj Gomółka leaves the Polish royal court for Kraków.
Orlande de Lassus succeeding Ludwig Daser as maestro di cappella to Albrecht V, Duke of Bavaria.
Nicola Vicentino becomes maestro di cappella at Vicenza Cathedral.

Publications 
Giovanni Animuccia – First book of laudi (Rome: Valerio Dorico)
Severin Cornet –  for four voices (Antwerp: Jean Laet)
Gallus Dressler –  (MS)
Giulio Fiesco – Madrigals for four and five voices (Venice: Girolamo Scotto), also includes four dialogues, two for seven voice and two for eight voices
Francisco Guerrero – Magnificats in all eight tones (Leuven: Pierre Phalèse)
Orlande de Lassus – Third book of madrigals for five voices (Rome: Antonio Barré)
Nicolaus Listenius – 
Francesco Portinaro – First book of madrigals for four voices (Venice: Girolamo Scotto)

Classical music 
Antonino Barges – Two motets

Births 
date unknown
John Dowland, English Renaissance composer, singer and lutenist (died 1626)
Cornelis Verdonck, Flemish composer of madrigals (died 1625)
approximate date
Giles Farnaby, English composer, perhaps from Truro, Cornwall (died 1640)
Andreas Raselius, German composer (died 1602)

Deaths 
February 2 – Hans Neusidler, composer (born c.1508)
August 11 – Bartolomé de Escobedo, composer (born c.110)
date unknown
Thomas Appleby, church musician and composer (born c.1488)
Francesco Cellavenia, composer
Francisco de Soto, organist and composer (born c.1500)
Thomas Preston, organist and composer

 
Music
16th century in music
Music by year